Joel Raymond Johnston (born March 8, 1967 in West Chester, Pennsylvania) is a former Major League Baseball relief pitcher. He played five seasons for the Pittsburgh Pirates, Kansas City Royals and Boston Red Sox. Johnston attended Marple Newtown High School and Penn State University.

Career
Johnston was drafted in the 3rd round of the 1988 amateur entry draft by the Royals. Less than 5 seasons later, on September 5, 1991, he made his major league debut at the age of 24. Perhaps his rookie season was his best season—in just over 22 innings, he gave up only one earned run for an ERA of 0.40. He also struck out 21 batters that year.

According to Baseball America, in 1992 Johnston was the Royals top prospect, and was also number 59 on Baseball America's 1992 Top 100 Prospects list.

After the season Johnston was traded to the Pirates with pitcher Dennis Moeller for second baseman José Lind, and he rebounded to an ERA of 3.38 in 33 games. However, after brief trials producing poor ERAs of 29.70 (1994) and 11.25 (1995), Johnston pitched his final major league game on May 12, 1995.

In 1996, Johnston played in 18 games for the Tennessee Tomahawks of the Big South League, and in 1997 he played for the Wei Chuan Dragons of the Chinese Professional Baseball League, winning the Taiwan Series.

Personal
Johnston currently resides in Downingtown, Pennsylvania.

References

Sources

1967 births
Living people
Pennsylvania State University alumni
Pittsburgh Pirates players
Kansas City Royals players
Boston Red Sox players
Major League Baseball pitchers
Baseball players from Pennsylvania
Penn State Nittany Lions baseball players
Eugene Emeralds players
Baseball City Royals players
Memphis Chicks players
Omaha Royals players
Buffalo Bisons (minor league) players
Syracuse Chiefs players
Pawtucket Red Sox players
Colorado Springs Sky Sox players
Tennessee Tomahawks players
People from West Chester, Pennsylvania